The list of ship launches in 1998 includes a chronological list of all ships launched in 1998.


==
References==

1998
1998 in transport